Birla Institute of Applied Sciences (BIAS), is a higher education institute located in Bhimtal, Uttarakhand, India. It is a sister institute to the Birla Institute of Technology Mesra, Ranchi. Formerly affiliated to Kumaon University, it is affiliated to Uttarakhand Technical University. 

Birla Institute of Applied Sciences is one of the most prestigious institute of the Nainital region for its Electronics and Communication Engineering and Computer Science department.

Location
Birla Institute Of Applied Sciences is located in Bhimtal, in the Nainital district of  Uttarakhand.

Academics
The institute offers full 4-year B.Tech courses and a 3-year MCA course, as well as various training programs and certification courses.

Undergraduate courses admission is through Joint Entrance Examination (JEE) conducted by the National Testing Agency (NTA) formerly conducted by CBSE.The counselling process is done  by Uttarakhand Technical University. Postgraduate course admission is based on a common entrance test conducted by Uttarakhand Technical University. Admissions are also offered based on Class XII percentages through spot counselling.

Infrastructure  
The institute campus consists of a central academic block, laboratory blocks, workshops, computer centers and staff quarters besides separate hostels for boys and girls. The institute is fully residential and includes the mess, common room. The institute is self-contained with its own security arrangements,  co-operative store, cafeteria and a PCO to take care of the sundry needs of the residents.

The central academic block consists of lecture halls, computer labs, a well-equipped library, and an IEEE Digital Library access. It also houses the conference room and various offices.
The institute offers an ensconced environment for the students. It also has a library with many academic books as well as novels.

References

External links
Birla Institute of Applied Sciences, Bhimtal

Birla Institute of Technology
Education in Nainital district
Universities and colleges in Uttarakhand
Educational institutions established in 1969
1969 establishments in Uttar Pradesh